Myla Pablo (born 12 September 1993 in Tarlac) is a Filipino volleyball player. She was part of the Philippines women's national volleyball team in 2015.

Personal life
Pablo was born on 12 September 1993 in Tarlac.

Career
Pablo was awarded Best Spiker in the UAAP Season 75, playing in 2013 with the NU- Lady Bulldogs. Later, in the 2013 Shakeys V-League Season 10, she also received the season's Best Spiker when the NU Lady Bulldogs won the league championship for the first time.

Pablo ranked seventh with her U23 national team in the 2015 Asian U23 Championship and later helped her senior to team to reach the 12th place in the 2015 Asian Championship. She was also awarded Finals Most Valuable Player from the 2015 Shakeys V-League Collegiate Conference Season 12 title won by the NU Lady Bulldogs. In the 2016 Shakeys V-League Open Conference Season 13 where she was awarded Finals Most Valuable Player and 2nd Best Open Spiker, this time with Pocari Sweat club.

In 2018, at the end of the PVL open conference, Pablo moved to Motolite when they agreed to buy out her contract with Pocari Sweat. In 2021, Motolite released all its player including Pablo, making her a free agent.

Clubs
  Philips Gold Lady Slammers (2015)
  Pocari Sweat Lady Warriors (2016–2018)
  Motolite Power Builders (2019–2021)
  Petro Gazz Angels (2021–2022)
  F2 Logistics Cargo Movers (2023–present)

Awards

Individual
 2013 UAAP Season 75 "Best Spiker"
 2013 Shakeys V-League Season 10 "Best Spiker"
 2015 Shakeys V-League Collegiate Conference Season 12 "Finals Most Valuable Player"
 2016 Shakeys V-League Open Conference Season 13 "Finals Most Valuable Player"
 2016 Shakeys V-League Open Conference Season 13 "2nd Best Outside Spiker"
 2017 Premier Volleyball League 1st Season Reinforced Open Conference "Finals Most Valuable Player"
 2017 Premier Volleyball League 1st Season Open Conference "1st Best Outside Spiker"
 2017 Premier Volleyball League 1st Season Open Conference "Conference Most Valuable Player"
 2018 Premier Volleyball League Reinforced Conference "2nd Best Outside Spiker"
 2018 Premier Volleyball League Reinforced Conference "Conference Most Valuable Player"
 2021 Premier Volleyball League Open Conference "2nd Best Outside Spiker"
 ''2022 Premier Volleyball League Reinforced Conference "2nd Best Outside Spiker"

Team

Premier Volleyball League: 
Petrogazz Angels

2021 PNVF Champions League: Petrogazz Angels

Premier V-League:
Pocari Sweat Lady Warriors

Philippine SuperLiga: Phillips Gold

Notes

References

1993 births
Living people
Sportspeople from Tarlac
National University (Philippines) alumni
Philippines women's international volleyball players
Filipino women's volleyball players
University Athletic Association of the Philippines volleyball players
Wing spikers
21st-century Filipino women
Outside hitters